Earl Cedric Ravenal (March 29, 1931 – August 31, 2019) was an American foreign policy analyst, academic, and writer. He served as a distinguished senior fellow in foreign policy studies at the Cato Institute and professor emeritus of the Georgetown University School of Foreign Service.

Ravenal was raised in Providence, Rhode Island. He graduated summa cum laude and Phi Beta Kappa from Harvard University, and received a Henry Fellowship to Cambridge University in England. He attended the Harvard Graduate School of Business Administration Middle Management Program.  Ravenal earned his MA and PhD from The Johns Hopkins University School of Advanced International Studies, where he taught prior to his appointment to Georgetown University.

Ravenal served as a division director in the Office of United States Secretary of Defense from 1967 to 1969, under Secretaries of Defense Robert McNamara and Clark Clifford.

In addition to writing several books on the topic of U.S. foreign policy, Ravenal wrote over 200 articles and papers for various publications including The New York Times, The Washington Post, and Foreign Affairs.

He was a candidate for the Libertarian Party's presidential nomination in the 1984 election, finishing second to the party's eventual nominee, David Bergland.

Ravenal died on August 31, 2019 at his secondary residence in Trappe, Maryland.

Published works

References

External links
 Earl C. Ravenal, Distinguished Senior Fellow, Cato Institute
 

1931 births
2019 deaths
20th-century American politicians
Alumni of the University of Cambridge
American foreign policy writers
American male non-fiction writers
Candidates in the 1984 United States presidential election
Cato Institute people
Walsh School of Foreign Service faculty
Harvard University alumni
Johns Hopkins University alumni
Johns Hopkins University faculty
People from Providence, Rhode Island
Washington, D.C., Libertarians